The GP Sofie Goos is a women's staged cycle race which takes place in Belgium and is currently rated by the UCI as category 1.2.

Overall winners

References 

Women's cycle races
Cycle races in Belgium